Filip Krajinović was the defending champion but chose not to defend his title.

Jurij Rodionov won the title after defeating Peđa Krstin 7–5, 6–2 in the final.

Seeds

Draw

Finals

Top half

Bottom half

References
Main Draw
Qualifying Draw

Almaty Challenger - Singles